Polybus (Πόλυβος) is an ancient Greek male name. It is the name of:

Historical figures:
 Polybus (physician) (fl. c. 400 BCE), author of On the Nature of Man

Mythical figures:

 Polybus (mythology) for mythological characters named Polybus
Polybus of Corinth, best known for having reared Oedipus
Polybus of Sicyon, a son of Hermes and king of Sicyon
Polybus of Thebes, king of the Egyptian Thebes
Polybus (Odyssey), father of Eurymachus
Polybus (Trojan War), a son of Antenor

See also 
 Polybius (disambiguation)